William Robert Jarvis (born 17 December 2002) is an English professional footballer who plays as a forward for Scarborough Athletic on loan from EFL Championship club Hull City.

Career
Jarvis signed his first professional contract with Hull City on 4 March 2021. He made his professional debut with Hull City in a 1–1 (7–8) EFL Cup penalty shootout loss to Wigan Athletic on 10 August 2021, and was one of his side's scorers in the shootout.

On 27 January 2022, Jarvis joined York City on a month-long loan.

On 18 March 2022, Jarvis joined Scarborough Athletic on loan until the end of the season.

On 16 August 2022, Jarvis rejoined Scarborough Athletic on a month-long loan.

References

External links
 

2002 births
Living people
Footballers from York
English footballers
Hull City A.F.C. players
York City F.C. players
Scarborough Athletic F.C. players
Association football forwards
English Football League players
National League (English football) players
Northern Premier League players